Ian John McKay, VC (7 May 1953 – 12 June 1982) was a British Army soldier and a posthumous recipient of the Victoria Cross, the highest award for gallantry in the face of the enemy that can be awarded to British and Commonwealth forces.

Born in Wortley, near Barnsley, South Yorkshire, McKay was the eldest of the three sons of Kenneth John McKay, a steel worker, and Freda Doreen Hargreaves. He was educated at Rotherham Grammar School.

McKay left school at seventeen and in August 1970 enlisted in the Army, training as a paratrooper. Posted to the 1st Battalion, the Parachute Regiment (1 Para) in early 1971, he served in Northern Ireland, where he is remembered as "Soldier T", Germany, and the United Kingdom. By April 1982 he was platoon sergeant of 4 Platoon, B Company, 3rd Battalion, The Parachute Regiment, and deployed with his unit for service in the Falklands War. He was killed during the Battle of Mount Longdon, when the deed described below took place, for which he was awarded the Victoria Cross.

Citation

After initial burial in the Falklands, McKay was later brought home, and on 26 November 1982 he was re-buried with full military honours at Aldershot Military Cemetery.

The medal
McKay's medals were sold by his wife around the year 1989, and his VC is now on display in the Lord Ashcroft Gallery at the Imperial War Museum, London.

Legacy
The Territorial Army centre in Sgt McKay's home town of Rotherham is named "McKay VC Barracks", also an accommodation block at the Defence Academy at Shrivenham was named McKay House in his honour.

In mid October 2011, the Sergeants and Warrant Officers bar at MPA, Falkland Islands, was renamed as "Ian McKay VC Bar" in his honour.

The McKay VC Gymnasium is a gym facility and sports hall located across the football fields at Vimy Barracks, Catterick Garrison. A facility that oversees the training of recruits from The Parachute Regiment and other Units.

McKay was profiled in the 2006 television docudrama Victoria Cross Heroes, which included archive footage, dramatisations of his actions and an interview with his mother.

References

External links
Location of grave and VC medal (Hampshire)
Sergeant Ian McKay
Falklands Hero: Ian McKay – Warfare Magazine

1953 births
1982 deaths
People from Wortley, South Yorkshire
British Parachute Regiment soldiers
British Army personnel of the Falklands War
British recipients of the Victoria Cross
Burials at Aldershot Military Cemetery
British military personnel killed in the Falklands War
British Army recipients of the Victoria Cross